Julien Lahaut (6 September 1884 – 18 August 1950) was a Belgian politician and communist activist. He became leader of the Communist Party of Belgium after the First World War. A dissident during the German occupation of 1940–44, he became a vocal advocate for the abolition of the Belgian monarchy during the post-war "Royal Question". His assassination in August 1950, at the height of the crisis, has often been attributed to Belgian royalists but remains unsolved.

Political background
During the First World War, Lahaut served in the Belgian army and was part of the Belgian Expeditionary Corps in Russia, fighting on the Eastern Front along with Imperial Russian forces. After his return to Belgium, he joined the new Communist Party of Belgium. He soon became a Communist deputy and was later the party's chairman. He was particularly vocal in his republican sympathies.

During the German occupation of Belgium (1940–44), as the head of the Communist Party, Lahaut led the Strike of the 100,000 in May 1941 and was arrested. After failing to escape from captivity in the Citadel of Huy, he was deported to Mauthausen concentration camp. Although suffering considerable health effects, he was still alive when the camp was liberated by the Allies in 1945.

Royal Question and assassination
The aftermath of the Liberation of Belgium saw a prolonged period of political crisis, known as the Royal Question, over whether King Leopold III, who was living in exile due to his decision to surrender to Nazi Germany in 1940, could return to his position as monarch. The crisis came to a head in 1950, when Leopold returned to Belgium, but quickly had to let his son Baudouin assume royal duties. (He would abdicate in Baudouin’s favour a year later.)

On 11 August 1950, Baudouin took the constitutional oath as regent before a joint session of both chambers of Parliament. During the proceedings, one of the communist deputies present shouted “” (“Long Live the republic!”). Lahaut was reported to have been the deputy responsible, though in the confusion of the moment this remains unconfirmed. A week later, on 18 August 1950, Lahaut was assassinated by two unknown gunmen outside his home in Seraing.

Coming at the end of the constitutional crisis, Lahaut's death caused widespread outrage, especially in left-wing circles. Strikes were organized all over the country, while 300,000 people attended his funeral. The Communist Party newspaper Le Drapeau rouge carried the headline: “A monstrous crime! Our dear comrade Julien Lahaut, leader of the Communist Party, was assassinated last night by the Leo-Rexists".

François Goossens, a Belgian royalist, was later identified as one of the murderers, although it is uncertain whether he fired the actual shots.

A similar incident happened in 1993 when Baudouin’s brother and successor Albert II took the oath: libertarian Jean-Pierre Van Rossem shouted “” (“Long live the republic of Europe, long live Julien Lahaut!”).

On 19 July 2012, the Senate agreed to consider a legal proposal to extend funding for a historical study on the assassination. On 17 August 2012, the minister Paul Magnette announced a federal contribution of €320,000 to the study.

In popular culture
In 1951 editorial cartoonist André Jacquemotte drew a biographical comic strip about Julien Lahaut's life, which ran in the magazine Jeunesse Belgique.

See also
Royal Question

Notes

References

Sources 
 Rudy Van Doorslaer & Etienne Verhoeyen, L'assassinat de Julien Lahaut, EPO, Bruxelles, 1987.

External links 
 Biography on the website of the Jules Destrée Institute 
 Call for a Parliamentary Commission on Julien Lahaut's assassination, 2000 
 Nollet débloque 150.000 euros pour investiguer sur l'assassinat de Julien Lahaut at Le Vif
 Julien Lahaut, un assassinat politique au temps de la guerre froide : documents inédits at Paris-Match

1884 births
1950 deaths
Assassinated Belgian politicians
Belgian communists
Belgian Army personnel of World War I
Belgian republicans
Belgian resistance members
Belgian trade unionists
Deaths by firearm in Belgium
Mauthausen concentration camp survivors
Members of the Chamber of Representatives (Belgium)
People from Seraing
People murdered in Belgium
Walloon movement activists
Walloon people
Political controversies in Belgium